Awaaz India TV is a Hindi-language 24/7 news television channel based in Nagpur, owned by Aman Kamble.
 It covers mainly the state of Maharashtra.

See also 
 National Dastak
 Lord Buddha TV

References

Hindi-language television channels in India
Television channels and stations established in 2009
Hindi-language television stations
Television stations in India